HK Trnava is an ice hockey team based in Trnava, Slovakia. It plays in the Slovak 1. Liga, the country's second division of ice hockey. The club was founded in 1957.

History
Ice hockey is played in Trnava since 1923 when the first friendly game between ŠK Trnava and 1.ČsŠK Bratislava was played at the nature rink in Eagle Garden. Since 1935 Trnava played in western area with three clubs from Bratislava (Slavia, VŠ, ČsŠK) and Nitra, Nove Mesto nad Vahom, Topoľčany and other. However, the club was founded in 1957. Since the season 2004–05, Trnava is playing in the Slovak 1. Liga.

Club names
 Club of ice sports Spartak Trnava
 Skating club
 HK Trnava
 HK Gladiators Trnava

Honours

Domestic

Slovak 1. Liga
  3rd place (5): 1998–99, 1999–2000, 2007–08, 2008–09, 2013–14

Slovak 2. Liga
  Winners (1): 2003–04

Sport achievements
 2003/04 - first team was promoted to the 1. hockey league again, juniors under 20 and the team under 18 were promoted to the Extraliga
 2004/05 - 3. place u18 in Extraliga u18
 2005/06 - 3. place u20 in Extraliga u20
 2013/14 - 1. place u18 in 1. hockey league u18

External links
 Official website 
 

Trnava
Ice hockey clubs established in 1957
Sport in Trnava
1957 establishments in Slovakia